Bey Kahnu (also Romanized as Bey Kahnū; also known as Beyn Kahnū, Bīkhkahnūch, and Pīr Kahnū) is a village in Gowharan Rural District, Gowharan District, Bashagard County, Hormozgan Province, Iran. At the 2006 census, its population was 352, in 81 families.

References 

Populated places in Bashagard County